The Irish Rebellion of 1798 (Ulster-Scots: The Hurries) was a major uprising against British rule in Ireland. The main organising force was the Society of United Irishmen, a republican revolutionary group influenced by the ideas of the American and French revolutions: originally formed by Presbyterian radicals angry at being shut out of power by the Anglican establishment, they were joined by many from the majority Catholic population.

Following some initial successes, particularly in County Wexford, the uprising was suppressed by government militia and yeomanry forces, reinforced by units of the British Army, with a civilian and combatant death toll estimated between 10,000 and 50,000. A French expeditionary force landed in County Mayo in August in support of the rebels: despite victory at Castlebar, they were also eventually defeated. The aftermath of the Rebellion led to the passing of the Acts of Union 1800, merging the Parliament of Ireland into the Parliament of the United Kingdom.

Despite its rapid suppression, the 1798 Rebellion remains a significant event in Irish history. Centenary celebrations in 1898
were instrumental in the development of modern Irish nationalism, while several of the Rebellion's key figures, such as Wolfe Tone, became important reference points for later republicanism. Debates over the significance of 1798, the motivation and ideology of its participants, and acts committed during the Rebellion continue to the present day.

Background 
Since 1691 and the end of the Williamite War, the government of Ireland had been dominated by an Anglican minority establishment. Membership of the Irish Parliament became restricted to members of the established church, who were expected to identify closely with the economic and political interests of England. The support of the Catholic gentry for the Jacobite side during the war had led to Parliament passing a series of Penal Laws, barring them from holding government or military positions and restricting Catholics' ability to purchase or inherit land. The proportion of land owned by Catholics, already reduced following earlier 17th century conflicts, continued to decline.

The effect of the Penal Laws was to destroy the political influence of the Catholic gentry, many of whom sought alternative opportunities in European militaries. The same laws, however, also discriminated against Presbyterians and other Protestant Dissenters, who were increasingly important in trade and commerce and were particularly strongly represented in Ulster.

Demands for political reform

By the middle of the 18th century, a number of factors combined to increase demands for political reform. Despite Ireland nominally being a sovereign kingdom governed by the monarch and its own Parliament, legislation such as the Declaratory Act 1719 meant it, in reality, had fewer privileges and freedoms than most of Britain's North American colonies. Merchants grew increasingly frustrated by commercial restrictions favouring England at Ireland's expense, adding to the list of grievances; it was claimed that Ireland was "debarred from the common and natural benefits of trade" while still being "obliged to support a large national [...] and military establishment". Financial controversies such as "Wood's halfpence" in 1724 and the "Money Bill Dispute" of 1753, over the appropriation of an Irish treasury surplus by the Crown, alienated sections of the Protestant professional class, leading to riots in Cork and Dublin.

This developing national consciousness led some members of the "Protestant Ascendancy" to advocate greater political autonomy from Great Britain. The movement was led by figures like Charles Lucas, a Dublin apothecary exiled in 1749 for promoting the so-called "patriot" cause: Lucas returned 10 years later and was elected as an MP, beginning a period of increased "patriot" influence in Parliament. Some of the "patriots" also began seeking support from the growing Catholic middle class: in 1749 George Berkeley, Bishop of Cloyne issued an address to the Catholic clergy, urging cooperation in the Irish national interest. In 1757 John Curry formed the Catholic Committee, which campaigned for repeal of the Penal Laws from a position of loyalty to the regime.

From 1778 onwards a number of local militias known as the Irish Volunteers were raised in response to the withdrawal of regular forces to fight in the American Revolutionary War. Thousands of middle- and upper-class Anglicans, along with a few Presbyterians and Catholics, joined the Volunteers, who became central to the growing sense of a distinct Irish political identity. Although the Volunteers were formed to defend Ireland against possible French invasion, many of their members and others in the "patriot" movement became strongly influenced by American efforts to secure independence, which were widely discussed in the Irish press. Close links with recent emigrants meant that northern Presbyterians were particularly sympathetic to the Americans, who they felt were subject to the same injustices.

In 1782 the Volunteers held a Convention at Dungannon which demanded greater legislative independence; this heavily influenced the British executive to amend legislation restricting the Irish Parliament, confirmed by the Irish Appeals Act 1783. With increased legislative independence secured, "Patriot" MPs such as Henry Grattan continued to press for greater enfranchisement, although the campaign quickly foundered on the issue of Catholic emancipation: although Grattan supported it, many "patriots" did not, and even the Presbyterians were "bitterly divided" on whether it should be immediate or gradual.

Against this background actual reform proceeded slowly. The Papists Act 1778 began to dismantle some earlier restrictions by allowing Catholics to join the army and to purchase land if they took an oath of allegiance to the Crown. In 1793 Parliament passed laws allowing Catholics meeting the property qualification to vote, but they could still neither be elected nor appointed as state officials.

Catholic opposition to the government

Since the early 18th century, the remains of the Catholic landowning class, once strongly Jacobite, had protected their position by adopting an "obsequious" attitude to the regime, cultivating the favour of the Hanoverian monarchs directly rather than that of a hostile Irish Parliament. The death of the Old Pretender in 1766, and Pope Clement XIII's subsequent recognition of the Hanoverians, reduced government suspicions of Jacobite sympathies among Catholics. Most senior Catholic churchmen also expressed loyalty to the government, hoping to secure increased tolerance. These attitudes however "barely impinged on [...] the mass of the population".

19th century historiography assumed that the rural, Catholic Ireland of the majority was largely quiet during the 18th century and unaffected by urban demands for reform. Outbreaks of rural violence by "Whiteboys" from the 1760s onwards, directed against landlords and tithe proctors, were assumed by historians such as Lecky to have been driven by local, agrarian issues such as tenant farmers' rents rather than wider political consciousness.

More recently it has been argued that the persistence of Jacobite imagery among Whiteboy and other groups suggests that strong opposition to Protestant and British rule remained widespread in Gaelic-speaking rural Ireland. A further dimension was provided by a younger generation of Catholic gentry and "middlemen"
in counties like Wexford, some of whom were radicalised by time spent in Revolutionary France, and who often emerged as local leaders in 1798.

Unrest had also grown in County Armagh in the decade prior to the Rebellion involving clashes between groups of "Defenders", a Catholic secret society, and Protestant gangs of "Break of Day Men" or "Peep o' Day Boys". Originating as nonsectarian "fleets" of young men, the groups emerged in north Armagh in the 1780s before spreading southwards. Like "Whiteboyism" this activity is often depicted as economic in origin, triggered by competition between Protestants and Catholics in the lucrative linen industry of the area. However, there is evidence that as time went on the Defenders developed an increasing political consciousness.

Formation of the Society of United Irishmen 

The 1789 French Revolution provided further inspiration to more radical members of the Volunteer movement, who saw it as an example of the common people cooperating to remove a corrupt regime. In early 1791, wool merchant Samuel Neilson, a former Volunteer who had attended the Dungannon convention, made plans to set up a pro-French newspaper, the Northern Star. He was joined from spring 1791 by a group from the Belfast Volunteers led by doctor William Drennan, who formed a secret political club called the "Irish Brotherhood". Inspired by events in France and the publication of Thomas Paine's Rights of Man, they drew up a programme including the independence of Ireland on a republican model, parliamentary reform, and the restoration of all civic rights to Catholics.

While Neilson, Drennan and the other Belfast radicals were Presbyterian, a second club set up the following month in Dublin included a more representative mix of Anglicans, Presbyterians and Catholics from the city's professional classes. One member, barrister Theobald Wolfe Tone, suggested the name "Society of United Irishmen", which was adopted by the whole organisation. The Society initially took a constitutional approach, but the 1793 outbreak of war with France forced the organisation underground when Pitt's government acted to suppress the political clubs. Tone fled to America, and Drennan was arrested and charged with seditious libel; although acquitted, he took little further part in events. In response Neilson and others in the Belfast group began restructuring the United Irishmen on revolutionary lines.

In May 1795 the Belfast delegates approved a "New System" of organisation: this was based on cells or 'societies' of 20–35 men, with a tiered structure of baronial, county, and provincial committees reporting to a single national committee, mirroring the structure of the Presbyterian church. In 1796 the New System was transformed into a military structure, each group of three 'societies' forming one company. Numbers grew rapidly; many Presbyterian shopkeepers and farmers joined in the North, while recruitment efforts among the Defenders
resulted in the admission of many new Catholic members across the country.

In the same period a group of new leaders were elected to the United "Directory" in Dublin, notably two radicals from the aristocracy, Arthur O'Connor and MP Lord Edward FitzGerald. Other members of the committee included lawyer Thomas Addis Emmet, physician William McNevin, and Catholic Committee secretary Richard McCormick. To augment their growing strength, the United Irish leadership decided to seek military help from the current French revolutionary government, the Directory. Tone travelled from the United States to France to press the case for intervention, landing at Le Havre in February 1796 following a stormy winter crossing.

The 1796 invasion attempt 

Tone had arrived in France without either instructions or accreditation from the United Irishmen, but almost single-handedly convinced the French Directory to alter its policy.  His written "memorials" on the situation in Ireland came to the attention of Director Lazare Carnot, who, seeing an opportunity to destabilise Great Britain, asked for a formal invasion plan to be developed. By May, General Henry Clarke, head of the War Ministry's Bureau Topographique, had drawn up an initial plan offering the Irish 10,000 troops and arms for 20,000 more men, with strict insistence that the United Irishmen attempt no rising until the French had landed. In June Carnot wrote to the experienced general Lazare Hoche asking him to act as commander and describing the plan as "the downfall of the most dangerous of our enemies. I see in it the safety of France for centuries to come."

A force of 15,000 veteran troops was assembled at Brest under Hoche. Sailing on 16 December, accompanied by Tone, the French arrived off the coast of Ireland at Bantry Bay on 22 December 1796 after eluding the Royal Navy; however, unremitting storms, bad luck and poor seamanship all combined to prevent a landing. Tone remarked that "England [...] had its luckiest escape since the Armada;" the fleet was forced to return home and the army intended to spearhead the invasion of Ireland was split up and sent to fight in other theatres of the French Revolutionary Wars.

Counter-insurgency and repression 

By 1797 reports began to reach Britain that a secret revolutionary army was being prepared in Ireland by Tone's associates. Naval mutinies at Spithead and the Nore suggested that French-inspired agitators were trying to spread the revolution to England; the crisis however appeared to pass, and in October the Navy defeated an invasion fleet of France's client state, the Batavian Republic, at Camperdown.

Tone had attempted to convince the increasingly influential general Napoleon Bonaparte, who had recently mounted a successful campaign in Italy that another landing in Ireland was feasible. Bonaparte initially showed little interest: he was largely unfamiliar with the Irish situation and needed a war of conquest, not of liberation, to pay his army. However, by February 1798 British spies reported he was preparing a fleet in the Channel ports ready for the embarkation of up to 50,000 men. Their destination remained unknown, but the reports were immediately passed to the Irish government under the Viceroy, Lord Camden.

In early 1798, a series of violent attacks on magistrates in County Tipperary, County Kildare and King's County alarmed the authorities. They also received information that a faction of the United Irish leadership, led by Fitzgerald and O'Connor, felt they were "sufficiently well organised and equipped" to begin an insurgency without French aid; they were opposed by Emmet, McCormick and NcNevin, who favoured an approach protecting life and property and wanted to wait for a French landing. Camden came under increasing pressure from hardline Irish MPs, led by Speaker John Foster, to crack down on the disorder in the south and midlands and arrest the Dublin leadership.

Camden prevaricated for some time, partly as he feared a crackdown would itself provoke an insurrection: the British Home Secretary Lord Portland agreed, describing the proposals as "dangerous and inconvenient". The situation changed when United Irish documents on manpower were leaked by an informer, silk merchant Thomas Reynolds, suggesting nearly 280,000 men across Ulster, Leinster and Munster were preparing to join the "revolutionary army". The Irish government learned from Reynolds that a meeting of the Leinster "Directory" had been set for 10 March in the Dublin house of wool merchant Oliver Bond, where a motion for an immediate rising would be voted on. Camden decided to move to arrest the leadership, arguing to London that he otherwise risked having the Irish Parliament turn against him. On the tenth, most of the moderates among the leadership such as Emmett, McNevin and Dublin City delegate Thomas Traynor were taken: several of the 'country' delegates arrived late to the meeting and escaped, as did McCormick. The only other senior member to escape was Fitzgerald himself, who went into hiding; the incident had the effect of strengthening Fitzgerald's faction and pushing the leadership towards rebellion.

The Irish government effectively imposed martial law on 30 March, although civil courts continued sitting. Overall command of the army was transferred from Ralph Abercromby to Gerard Lake, who supported an aggressive approach against suspected rebels.

A rising in Cahir, County Tipperary broke out in response, but was quickly crushed by the High Sheriff, Col. Thomas Judkin-Fitzgerald. Militants led by Samuel Neilson and Lord Edward FitzGerald with the help of co-conspirator Edmund Gallagher dominated the rump United Irish leadership and planned to rise without French aid, fixing the date for 23 May.

Rebellion 
The initial plan was to take Dublin, with the counties bordering Dublin to rise in support and prevent the arrival of reinforcements followed by the rest of the country who were to tie down other garrisons.  The signal to rise was to be spread by the interception of the mail coaches from Dublin. However, last-minute intelligence from informants provided the Government with details of rebel assembly points in Dublin and a huge force of military occupied them barely one hour before rebels were to assemble. The Army then arrested most of the rebel leaders in the city. Deterred by the military, the gathering groups of rebels quickly dispersed, abandoning the intended rallying points, and dumping their weapons in the surrounding lanes. In addition, the plan to intercept the mail coaches miscarried, with only the Munster-bound coach halted at Johnstown, near Naas, on the first night of the rebellion.

Although the planned nucleus of the rebellion had imploded, the surrounding districts of Dublin rose as planned and were swiftly followed by most of the counties surrounding Dublin. The first clashes of the rebellion took place just after dawn on 24 May. Fighting quickly spread throughout Leinster, with the heaviest fighting taking place in County Kildare where, despite the Army successfully beating off almost every rebel attack, the rebels gained control of much of the county as military forces in Kildare were ordered to withdraw to Naas for fear of their isolation and destruction as at Prosperous. However, rebel defeats at Carlow and the hill of Tara, County Meath, effectively ended the rebellion in those counties. In County Wicklow, news of the rising spread panic and fear among loyalists; they responded by massacring rebel suspects held in custody at Dunlavin Green and in Carnew. A baronet, Sir Edward Crosbie, was found guilty of leading the rebellion in Carlow and executed for treason.

Spreading of the rebellion 

[[File:MAXWELL(1845) p184 Defeat at Vinegar Hill.jpg|thumb|left|Defeat of the Rebels at Vinegar Hill, by George Cruikshank.]]

In County Wicklow, large numbers rose but chiefly engaged in a bloody rural guerrilla war with the military and loyalist forces. General Joseph Holt led up to 1,000 men in the Wicklow Mountains and forced the British to commit substantial forces to the area until his capitulation in October.

In the north-east, mostly Presbyterian rebels led by Henry Joy McCracken rose in County Antrim on 6 June. They briefly held most of the county, but the rising there collapsed following defeat at Antrim town. In County Down, after initial success at Saintfield, rebels were defeated on the 11th at Portaferry and, led by Henry Munro, decisively in the longest battle of the rebellion at Ballynahinch on the 12th.

The rebels had most success in the south-eastern county of Wexford where forces primarily led by Fr. John Murphy seized control of the county, but a series of bloody defeats at the Battle of New Ross, Battle of Arklow, and the Battle of Bunclody prevented the effective spread of the rebellion beyond the county borders. 20,000 troops eventually poured into Wexford and defeated the rebels at the Battle of Vinegar Hill on 21 June. The dispersed rebels spread in two columns through the midlands, Kilkenny, and finally towards Ulster. The last remnants of these forces fought on until their final defeat on 14 July at the battles of Knightstown Bog, County Meath and Ballyboughal, County Dublin.

French intervention

On 22 August, nearly two months after the main uprisings had been defeated, about 1,000 French soldiers under General Humbert landed in the north-west of the country, at Kilcummin in County Mayo. Joined by up to 5,000 local rebels, they had some initial success, inflicting a humiliating defeat on the British in Castlebar  (also known as the Castlebar races to commemorate the speed of the retreat) and setting up a short-lived "Irish Republic" with John Moore as president of one of its provinces, Connacht. This sparked some supportive uprisings in Longford and Westmeath which were quickly defeated. The Franco-Irish force won another minor engagement at the battle of Collooney before the main force was defeated at the battle of Ballinamuck, in County Longford, on 8 September 1798. The Irish Republic had only lasted twelve days from its declaration of independence to its collapse. The French troops who surrendered were repatriated to France in exchange for British prisoners of war, but hundreds of the captured Irish rebels were executed.

Despite their general anti-clericalism and hostility to the Bourbon monarchy, the French Directory suggested to the United Irishmen in 1798 restoring the Jacobite Pretender, Henry Benedict Stuart, as Henry IX, King of the Irish. This was on account of General Jean Joseph Amable Humbert landing a force in County Mayo for the Irish Rebellion of 1798 and realising the local population were devoutly Catholic (a significant number of Irish priests supported the Rising and had met with Humbert, although Humbert's Army had been veterans of the anti-clerical campaign in Italy). The French Directory hoped this option would allow the creation of a stable French client state in Ireland, however, Wolfe Tone, the Protestant republican leader, scoffed at the suggestion and it was quashed.

On 12 October 1798, a larger French force consisting of 3,000 men, and including Wolfe Tone himself, attempted to land in County Donegal near Lough Swilly. They were intercepted by a larger Royal Navy squadron, and finally surrendered after a three-hour battle without ever landing in Ireland. Wolfe Tone was tried by court-martial in Dublin and found guilty. He asked for death by firing squad, but when this was refused, Tone cheated the hangman by slitting his own throat in prison on 12 November, and died a week later.

 Aftermath 

Small fragments of the great rebel armies of the Summer of 1798 survived for a number of years and waged a form of guerrilla or "fugitive" warfare in several counties. In County Wicklow, General Joseph Holt fought on until his negotiated surrender in Autumn 1798. It was not until the failure of Robert Emmet's rebellion in 1803 that the last organised rebel forces under Captain Michael Dwyer capitulated. Small pockets of rebel resistance had also survived within Wexford and the last rebel group under James Corcoran was not vanquished until February 1804.

The Act of Union, having been passed in August 1800, came into effect on 1 January 1801 and took away the measure of autonomy granted to Ireland's Protestant Ascendancy. It was passed largely in response to the rebellion and was underpinned by the perception that the rebellion was provoked by the brutish misrule of the Ascendancy as much as the efforts of the United Irishmen.

Religious, if not economic, discrimination against the Catholic majority was gradually abolished after the Act of Union but not before widespread mobilisation of the Catholic population under Daniel O'Connell. Discontent at grievances and resentment persisted but resistance to British rule now largely manifested itself along anti-taxation lines, as in the Tithe War of 1831–36.

Presbyterian radicalism was effectively tamed or reconciled to British rule by inclusion in a new Protestant Ascendancy, as opposed to a merely Anglican one. By mid-1798 a schism between the Presbyterians and Catholics had developed, with radical Presbyterians starting to waver in their support for revolution. The government capitalised on this by acting against the Catholics in the radical movement instead of the northern Presbyterians. Prior to the rebellion, anyone who admitted to being a member of the United Irishmen was expelled from the Yeomanry, however former Presbyterian radicals were now able to enlist in it, and those radicals that wavered in support saw it as their chance to reintegrate themselves into society. The government also had news of the sectarian massacre of Protestants at Scullabogue spread to increase Protestant fears and enhance the growing division. Anglican clergyman Edward Hudson claimed that "the brotherhood of affection is over", as he enlisted former radicals into his Portglenone Yeomanry corps. On 1 July 1798 in Belfast, the birthplace of the United Irishmen movement, it is claimed that everyman had the red coat of the Yeomanry on. However, the Protestant contribution to the United Irish cause was not yet entirely finished as several of the leaders of the 1803 rebellion were Anglican or Presbyterian.

Nevertheless, this fostering or resurgence of religious division meant that Irish politics was largely, until the Young Ireland movement in the mid-19th century, steered away from the unifying vision of the egalitarian United Irishmen and based on sectarian fault lines with Unionist and Dublin Castle individuals at the helm of power in Ireland. After Robert Emmet's rebellion of 1803 and the Act of Union Ulster Presbyterians and other dissenters were likely bought off by British/English Anglican ruling elites with industry ship building wollen mill and as the 19th century progressed they become less and less radical and Republican/Nationalist in outlook.

 Atrocities 

The intimate nature of the conflict meant that the rebellion at times took on the worst characteristics of a civil war, especially in Leinster. Catholic resentment was fuelled by the remaining Penal Laws still in force. Rumours of planned massacres by both sides were common in the days before the rising and led to a widespread climate of fear across the nation.

Government
The aftermath of almost every British victory in the rising was marked by the massacre of captured and wounded rebels with some on a large scale such as at Carlow, New Ross, Ballinamuck and Killala. The British were responsible for particularly gruesome massacres at Gibbet Rath, New Ross and Enniscorthy, burning rebels alive in the latter two. For those rebels who were taken alive in the aftermath of battle, being regarded as traitors to the Crown, they were not treated as prisoners of war but were executed, usually by hanging. Local forces publicly executed suspected members of the United Irishmen without trial in Dunlavin in what is known as the Dunlavin Green executions, and in Carnew days after the outbreak of the rebellion.

In addition, non-combatant civilians were murdered by the military, who also carried out many instances of rape, particularly in County Wexford.Moore, Sir John The Diary of Sir John Moore p. 295 ed. J.F Maurice (London 1904) Many individual instances of murder were also unofficially carried out by local Yeomanry units before, during and after the rebellion as their local knowledge led them to attack suspected rebels. "Pardoned" rebels were a particular target.

According to the historian Guy Beiner, the Presbyterian insurgents in Ulster suffered more executions than any other arena of the 1798 rebellion, and the brutality with which the insurrection was quelled in counties Antrim and Down was long remembered in local folk traditions.

Rebel
County Wexford was the only area which saw widespread atrocities by the rebels during the Wexford Rebellion. Massacres of loyalist prisoners took place at the Vinegar Hill camp and on Wexford bridge. After the defeat of a rebel attack at New Ross, the Scullabogue Barn massacre occurred, in which between 80 and 200 mostly Protestant men, women, and children were imprisoned in a barn which was then set alight. In Wexford town, on 20 June some 70 loyalist prisoners were marched to the bridge (first stripped naked, according to an unsourced claim by historian James Lydon) and piked to death.

 Legacy 

Contemporary estimates put the death toll from 20,000 (Dublin Castle) to as many as 50,000 of which 2,000 were military and 1,000 loyalist civilians. Some modern research argues that these figures may be too high. Firstly, a list of British soldiers killed, compiled for a fund to aid the families of dead soldiers, listed just 530 names. Secondly, professor Louis Cullen, through an examination of depletion of the population in County Wexford between 1798 and 1820, put the fatalities in that county due to the rebellion at 6,000. Historian Thomas Bartlett therefore argues, "a death toll of 10,000 for the entire island would seem to be in order". Other modern historians believe that the death toll may be even higher than contemporary estimates suggest as the widespread fear of repression among relatives of slain rebels led to mass concealment of casualties.

By the centenary of the Rebellion in 1898, conservative Irish nationalists and the Catholic Church would both claim that the United Irishmen had been fighting for "Faith and Fatherland", and this version of events is still, to some extent, the lasting popular memory of the rebellion. A series of popular "98 Clubs" were formed. At the bicentenary in 1998, the non-sectarian and democratic ideals of the Rebellion were emphasised in official commemorations, reflecting the desire for reconciliation at the time of the Good Friday Agreement which was hoped would end "The Troubles" in Northern Ireland.

According to R. F. Foster, the 1798 rebellion was "probably the most concentrated episode of violence in Irish history".

 List of major engagements 

 Notable people 
 

Louis de Crestou (1756–1798), a French officer of the United Irishmen Rebellion

 See also 
 Atlantic Revolutions
 Battles during the 1798 rebellion
 Castle Hill convict rebellion in Sydney, Australia
 French Revolutionary Wars
 Irish issue in British politics
 List of Irish rebellions
 Society of United Irishmen
 United Irish Uprising in Newfoundland
 List of monuments and memorials to the Irish Rebellion of 1798
 Wars of national liberation

 References 

Sources
 
 
 
 
 
 
 
 

 Further reading 
 
 Aston, Nigel (2002) Christianity and Revolutionary Europe, 1750–1830, Cambridge University Press .
 Bartlett, Thomas, Kevin Dawson, Daire Keogh, Rebellion, Dublin 1998
 
 
 
 Dickson, C.  The Wexford Rising in 1798: its causes and course (1955).
 David Dickson, Daire Keogh & Kevin Whelan, eds. The United Irishmen: Republicanism, Radicalism and Rebellion (Dublin, The Lilliput Press, 1993)
 Ehrman, John. The Younger Pitt: vol 3: The Consuming Struggle (1996) pp 158–196
 Elliott, Marianne. Partners in Revolution: The United Irishmen and France (Yale UP, 1982)
 Hayes-McCoy, G.A.  "Irish Battles" (1969)
 Ingham, George R. Irish Rebel, American Patriot: William James Macneven, 1763–1841, Seattle, WA: Amazon Books, 2015.
 McDowell,  R. B. Ireland in the Age of Imperialism and Revolution, 1760–1801 (1991) pp 595–651.
 Pakenham, T. The Year of Liberty (London 1969) reprinted in 1998.
 Pittock, Murray GH (2006) Poetry and Jacobite Politics in Eighteenth-Century Britain and Ireland, Cambridge University Press .
 Rose, J. Holland. William Pitt and the Great War (1911) pp 339–364  online
 Smyth, James. The Men of No Property: Irish Radicals and Popular Politics in the late 18th century. (Macmillan, 1992).
 Todd, Janet M. Rebel daughters: Ireland in conflict 1798 (Viking, 2003).
 Whelan, Kevin. The Tree of Liberty: Radicals, Catholicism and the Construction of Irish Identity, 1760–1830. (Cork University Press, 1996).
 (attrib.) 
 Zimmermann, Georges Denis. Songs of Irish rebellion: Irish political street ballads and rebel songs, 1780–1900 (Four Courts Press, 2002).

 In the arts 
 Liberty or Death – by British author David Cook (2014). A novella about the rebellion.
 The Year of the French – Thomas Flanagan, 1979. An historical novel about the events in County Mayo.
 Glenarvon'' (1816) – a novel by Lady Caroline Lamb set during the Rebellion, combining elements of the roman à clef, the Gothic Novel, and the Historical Novel.

External links 
 National 1798 Centre – Enniscorthy, Co. Wexford
 The 1798 Irish Rebellion – BBC History
 The 1798 Rebellion in County Clare – Clare library
 The 1798 Rebellion – Irish anarchist analysis
 General Joseph Holt of the 1798 Rebellion in Wicklow
 Fugitive Warfare – 1798 in North Kildare
 Map of Dublin 1798
 
 

 
1798
Rebellion
18th-century rebellions
Rebellions against the British Empire
Wars involving France
Wars involving Great Britain
Wars involving Ireland
Irish republicanism
Ireland–United Kingdom military relations
French Directory
Rebellion of 1798